The Office of Planning and Budget (OPP) is a dependency of the Presidency of Uruguay that is responsible for advising the Executive Power in the formulation of national and departmental plans, programs and policies as well as in the definition of the Government's economic and social strategy. It is headquartered in the Executive Tower, Montevideo. The Director of the Office of Planning and Budget is appointed by the President of the Republic at the beginning of the mandate. The position has the same requirements as that of Cabinet Minister and, in practice, has a similar hierarchy. He usually participates in the meetings of the Council of Ministers. The current head is Isaac Alfie, who has held the position since March 1, 2020.

History

1960–1967 
By decree of the National Council of Government of January 27, 1960, the Investment and Economic Development Commission was created. This commission was chaired by the Minister of Finance and also made up of the Ministers of Public Works, Industry and Labor, Livestock and Agriculture, the General Accountant of the Nation, the Director of Public Credit and a Director of the Bank of the Oriental Republic of Uruguay.

Its functions were to formulate organic plans for economic development; project and seek its internal and external financing; coordinate all efforts to increase national productivity; and monitor the implementation of approved plans. It operated between January 27, 1960 and February 28, 1967, its Technical Secretary was the economist Enrique Iglesias.

1967–1976 
In 1967, the constitutional reform approved in the plebiscite of November 27, 1966 came into effect. Article 230 of the new Constitution. This established: "There will be a Planning and Budget Office that will report directly to the Presidency of the Republic. It will be directed by a Commission made up of representatives of the Ministers related to development and by a Director appointed by the President of the Republic who will preside over it".

1976–1985 
In the civic-military dictatorship, by the so-called Institutional Act No. 3 (articles 3 and 4), of September 1, 1976, the Planning, Coordination and Dissemination Secretariat was created, replacing the Office of Planning and Budget.

1985–present 
With the restoration of institutional normality, on March 1, 1985, the Planning Secretary was null and void. Decree No. 96/985 organized and established its tasks, objectives, and organizational structure.

Functions 
The Oficce of Planning and Budget advises the Executive Power on:

 The definition of the Government's economic and social strategy;
 The formulation of national and departmental plans, programs and policies consistent with it;
 The elaboration and evaluation based on performance indicators of the National Budget and Accountability projects;
 The analysis and evaluation of the budgets, investment plans and rates of the organizations of article 221 of the Constitution of the Republic;
 The conduction of the processes of modernization and reform of the State; and
 The planning of decentralization policies.

References

External links 

 Oficina de Planeamiento y Presupuesto

Economy of Uruguay
1967 establishments in Uruguay
Government agencies established in 1967